Shively (formerly Shiveley, Bluff Prairie, and Paradise) is an unincorporated community in Humboldt County, California.

A post office operated at Shively from 1906 to 1965.

See also
 Northwestern Pacific Railroad

References

Unincorporated communities in Humboldt County, California
Unincorporated communities in California